Therambil Ramakrishnan is a lawyer and an Indian National Congress politician from Thrissur and a former Member of the Legislative Assembly of Thrissur to Kerala Legislative Assembly in 1982, 1991, 1996, 2001, 2006 and 2011. He was the former Speaker of Kerala Legislative Assembly from 1995–96, 2004–2006. He also serves as a member of KPCC Executive.

References

Indian National Congress politicians from Kerala
Malayali politicians
People from Thrissur district
1941 births
Living people
Sree Kerala Varma College alumni
Speakers of the Kerala Legislative Assembly
Kerala MLAs 1982–1987
Kerala MLAs 1991–1996
Kerala MLAs 1996–2001
Kerala MLAs 2001–2006
Kerala MLAs 2006–2011
Kerala MLAs 2011–2016